Gangadhar Vithoba Pantawane (28 June 1937 – 27 March 2018) was an Indian Marathi language writer, reviewer and Ambedkarite thinker from the state of Maharashtra. He was the follower of B. R. Ambedkar, polymath and the father of the Indian Constitution. He is one of the pioneers of the dalit literary movement" in Maharashtra. In 2008, he was elected president of the first Marathi Vishwa Sahitya Sammelan that was held in the United States. His pioneering journal, Asmitadarsh, galvanised generations of Dalit writers and thinkers. In 2018, he was honored with the Padma Shri by the Government of India.

Life and career 
Gangadhar Pantawane was born on 28 June 1937 in the Pachpawali area of Nagpur city. His father Vithoba Pantawane was not well-educated but he was linked to Babasaheb Ambedkar's egalitarian movement. Their lives have been spent in poverty. Gangadhar completed his elementary education from D.C. Mission school and secondary education from Navyug Vidyalaya and Patwardhan High School, Nagpur. When Babasaheb Ambedkar had come to Nagpur in 1946, when he was 9 years old, he was very impressed by seeing them. For the second time when Babasaheb came to Nagpur, he got a chance to meet and talk to him. After matriculation examination in 1956, Gagangadhar Pantawane got BA and MA degree from Nagpur College. in 1987, he got PhD from Marathwada University (now Dr. Babasaheb Ambedkar Marathwada University. His PhD's thesis research is about on journalism of Ambedkar named "Patrakar Dr. Babasaheb Ambedkar" (English: Journalist Dr. Babasaheb Ambedkar). Before moving to Aurangabad in the early 1960s as a professor in Milind College, Aurangabad where he spent 15 years of service and than worked as a professor of Marathi at Dr. Babasaheb Ambedkar Marathwada University, Aurangabad for 20 years. He used to write articles and plays with studies, teachers and editorials. "Mrutyu Shala" (School of Death) is a drama written by him. He also organized the Asmitadarsh Sahitya Sammelan every year.

Conversion 

With the presence of 6,00,000 people Pantawane embraced Buddhism at the hands of Babasaheb Ambedkar at Deekshabhoomi, Nagpur on 14 October 1956.

Death 
Pantawane died on 27 March 2018 in city of Aurangabad due to illness.

Writings 
Pantawane, had written 16 books and edited 10 books in Marathi language. He was also a founder of journal called 'Asmitadarsh'.

Marathi books 
 Ambedkari Janivanchi Aatmapratyayi Kavita (Goda publication)
 Sanity: Shod ani Samvadh (2002)
 Sahitya Nirmiti: Charcha ani Chikitsa
 Sahitya: Prakruti ani Pravruti (1999)
 Arth ani Anvayarth
 Chaitya Dalit Vaicharik Wangmay
 Dusrya Pidhiche Manogat
 Kille Panhala te Kille Vishalgad
 Dhamma Charchha
 Patrakar Dr. Babasaheb Ambedkar (1987)
 Mulyavedhleni (1972)
 Lokrang
 Wadlache Vanshaj
 Vidrohache Pani Petale Aahe (1976)
 Smrutishesh (Suvidya publication)
 Dalitanche Prabodhan (1978)
 Prabodhanachya Disha (1984)

Editing 

 Dr. Babasaheb Ambedkar Yanche Nivdak Lekh
 Asmitadarsh
 Dalit-Gramin Marathi Shabdkosh
 Dalit Atmakatha
 Dalit Sahitya
 Charcha ani Chintan
 Lokrang
 Shtri Atmakatha
 Maharancha Sanskrutik Itihas

Honors & awards 
List of awards and honours won by Gangadhar Pantawane.

 Padma Shri, 2018
 Dr. Babasaheb Ambedkar Jivan Gaurav Award, 2016
 Maharshi Vittal Ramaji Shinde Award, 2006, Wai, Satara
 Phadakule Pursakar, 2018
 Aurangabad Bhushan Award, 2014, Rotary club of Aurangabad

References 

1937 births
2018 deaths
20th-century Indian writers
Writers from Nagpur
Recipients of the Padma Shri in literature & education
Dalit activists
Marathi people
Social workers
20th-century Buddhists
21st-century Buddhists
Social workers from Maharashtra
Converts to Buddhism from Hinduism
Indian Buddhists
Dr. Babasaheb Ambedkar Marathwada University alumni